RBD may refer to:

Computing 
 Rational Business Developer, an IDE from IBM
 RADOS Block Device, a feature of the Ceph (software) storage management system
 Amiga rigid disk block (RDB), the root block of the Amiga disk partitioning structure
 Robot Programming by demonstration, programming a robot by performing the desired task

Other uses 
 RBD, IATA code for Dallas Executive Airport, Texas, US 
 Rapid eye movement sleep behavior disorder, a sleep disorder occurring during REM sleep
 RBD (band), a Mexican pop group
 Recurrent brief depression, a psychological disorder
 Reichsbahndirektion, a term for Railway divisions in Germany
 Reliability block diagram, a method for evaluating system reliabity
 River Basin District, a hydrological area designated under the European Union's Water Framework Directive
 "Refined, bleached, and deodorized", designation for some processed natural oils, such as palm oil
 Receptor binding domain